This is a list of Jewish members of the United States Congress. , there are 10 Jewish senators and 27 Jewish members of the House of Representatives serving in the United States Congress.

Senate

Elected to the Senate, but not seated

House of Representatives

Territorial delegates

Elected to the House of Representatives, but not seated

See also
 List of Jewish American politicians
 List of Buddhist members of the United States Congress
 List of Hindu members of the United States Congress
 List of Mormon members of the United States Congress
 List of Muslim members of the United States Congress
 List of Quaker members of the United States Congress

Notes

References

Jewish
 
 
United States Congress members